Mira Todorova (born 12 April 1994) is a Bulgarian volleyball player.

She competed with the Bulgarian women's national volleyball team, at the 2021 Women's European Volleyball League, winning a gold medal.

With her club Voléro Zürich she competed at the 2014 FIVB Volleyball Women's Club World Championship.

References

External links
 profile at FIVB.org

1994 births
Living people
Bulgarian expatriate sportspeople in Switzerland
Bulgarian women's volleyball players
Place of birth missing (living people)
European Games competitors for Bulgaria
Volleyball players at the 2015 European Games
Middle blockers